Kaltrina Neziri is a  Kosovar model and beauty pageant titleholder who was crowned as Miss Kosova Earth 2014 and will compete in Miss Earth 2015.

Pageantry

Miss Kosova 2014
Kaltrina won the title of Miss Earth Kosova 2014 and becomes Donika Emini's successor.

Miss Earth 2015
By winning Miss Earth Kosovo, Kaltrina will represent Kosovo at Miss Earth 2015 pageant. However, she is unplaced on that pageant.

References

External links
Official Miss Kosovo website
Miss Earth Official Website

Kosovan beauty pageant winners
Kosovo Albanians
Living people
Miss Earth 2015 contestants
People from Pristina
Year of birth missing (living people)